David John Hartshorn (born 17 May 1966) is a former New Zealand cricketer who captained the under-19 team to three 'Test' draws and three 'ODI' losses against the Australian under-19 team. A right-hand batsman and leg-break bowler he played 26 first-class matches, scoring 863 runs and taking 42 wickets. He also played seven List A matches.

External links 

1966 births
Canterbury cricketers
Central Districts cricketers
Living people
New Zealand cricketers
New Zealand Youth One Day International captains
New Zealand Youth Test captains